Wuppertal Zoologischer Garten station (locally also called Zoo station) is a station on the Düsseldorf–Elberfeld railway in the city of Wuppertal in the German state of North Rhine-Westphalia. The station building was heritage-listed on 31 August 1987. It is classified by Deutsche Bahn as a category 4 station.

The station building 
Wuppertal Zoo was opened in western Wuppertal in 1881, in the Zooviertel ("zoo quarter"). The station was constructed after the take-over of the Düsseldorf–Elberfeld line by the Prussian state railways, on 1 January 1882, following the nationalisation of the Bergisch-Märkische Railway Company. The dating of the start of construction is difficult, it was dedicated in 1898, but the building is already visible in a photograph from 1892 and some sources say construction began in 1886. The entrance building is on Siegfriedstrasse and it is connected by a straight connecting street, Walkürenallee, which provides a vista to the Zoo entrance on Hubertusallee.

It is a single-storey timber-framed building, covered with a protruding hip roof. A striking feature is the prefabricated two-storey entrance tower, which has a steep hip roof. The tower has a balcony-like gable dormer and it is perforated with a round arch.

The station building is now used as a restaurant.

Rail services 

Since the establishment of the line S 8 of the Rhine-Ruhr S-Bahn on 29 May 1988, the station no longer used for long-distance traffic and it is now only served by S-Bahn trains.

The station is also served by bus route 639, operated every 60 minutes by WSW mobil.

The remains of the former access to the long distance platform can still be seen today between the two middle tracks on the northern side of the pedestrian bridge. The platform itself has been completely removed, however, although the mainline tracks are still in the same position, so that in the area between the tracks at the station is much greater than usual.

The S-Bahn station is about 500m from two stations on the Wuppertal Suspension Railway: Zoo/Stadion and Varresbecker Straße.

Notes

External links 

Rhine-Ruhr S-Bahn stations
S9 (Rhine-Ruhr S-Bahn)
Railway stations in Wuppertal
S8 (Rhine-Ruhr S-Bahn)
Railway stations in Germany opened in 1882